911 or 9/11 may refer to:

Dates
 AD 911
 911 BC
 September 11
 9/11, the September 11 attacks of 2001
 11 de Septiembre, Chilean coup d'état in 1973 that outed the democratically elected Salvador Allende 
 November 9

Numbers
 911 (number)
 9-1-1, an emergency telephone number in North America
 9-1-1 (Philippines), an emergency telephone number in the Philippines

Film
 9/11: The Twin Towers, a 2006 documentary special about the 9/11 attacks 
 9/11 (2002 film), a documentary about the 9/11 attacks
 9/11 (2017 film), a drama film about the 9/11 attacks
 Reno 911!: Miami, a 2007 cop comedy movie based on the Reno 911! series

Literature
 9-11 (Noam Chomsky), a collection of essays by and interviews with Noam Chomsky
 9-11: Artists Respond, Volume One, a benefit comic published by Dark Horse Comics, Chaos! Comics, and Image Comics
 9-11: Emergency Relief, a benefit comic published by Alternative Comics

Music

Groups
 911 (English group), a boy band formed in 1995
 Nine One One (band), a Taiwanese hip hop group formed in 2009

Albums
 9.11 (album), a 2001 album by Ron "Bumblefoot" Thal

Songs
 "911", a 1986 song  by Cyndi Lauper from True Colors
 "911 Is a Joke", a 1990 song by Public Enemy
 "911" (Wyclef Jean song) (2000)
 "911" (Gorillaz and D12 song) (2001)
 "911" (King Giddra song) (2002)
 "911", a 2012 song by Rick Ross from God Forgives, I Don't
 "911 / Mr. Lonely", a 2017 song by Tyler, the Creator
 "911" (Lady Gaga song) (2020)
 "911", a 2021 song by Sech

Television
 9-1-1 (TV series), a 2018 American procedural drama series
 9-1-1: Lone Star, a 2020 spinoff of 9-1-1
 "911" (Law & Order: Special Victims Unit), a 2005 episode of Law & Order: Special Victims Unit
 "911" (Dexter's Laboratory), a 1997 episode of Dexter's Laboratory
 Reno 911!, an American comedy television series
 Rescue 911, an CBS docudrama series based on real emergencies

Transportation
 Porsche 911, a series of German sports cars
 BOAC Flight 911, a flight that crashed in 1966
 HTMS Chakri Naruebet (CVH-911), an aircraft carrier of the Royal Thai Navy
 List of highways numbered 911

Other uses
 911 (wrestler), an American professional wrestler
 911 Agamemnon, an asteroid
 911 Battalion (SWATF), a Namibian military unit
 Springfield Armory 911, a semi-automatic pistol

See also
 List of comics about the September 11 attacks